Italian Postcards is a 1987 Italian drama film directed by Memè Perlini. It was screened in the Un Certain Regard section at the 1987 Cannes Film Festival.

Cast
 Geneviève Page
 Lindsay Kemp
 Christiana Borghi
 David Brandon
 Stefano Davanzati
 Antonello Fassari - Eugenio - il fantasista
 Rosa Fumetto
 Alessando Genesi
 Franco Piacentini
 Ines Carmona
 Maria Marchi
 Giovanna Bardi
 Isabella Martelli

References

External links

1987 films
1980s Italian-language films
1987 drama films
Films directed by Memè Perlini
Films scored by Stefano Mainetti
Italian drama films
1980s Italian films